Jennifer Williamson (born 1973/1974) is an American attorney and a Democratic politician who represented Oregon's 36th District in the Oregon House of Representatives. She served as Majority Leader from 2015 to 2019.

Early life and education
Born in Washington County, Oregon, Williamson graduated from the University of Oregon, and received a J.D. degree from Willamette University College of Law.

Political career
In 2012, she defeated Sharon Meieran in the Democratic primary to replace state representative Mary Nolan.

Williamson was named a 2014 Aspen Institute Rodel Fellow.

On February 10, 2020, Williamson abruptly dropped out of the race for Oregon Secretary of State due to allegations of unusual campaign spending while an Oregon House member including extensive worldwide and domestic travel, real estate rentals from family members, food and drink expenditures in lieu of per diem, and more.

References

External links
 Jennifer for Oregon
 House website

21st-century American politicians
21st-century American women politicians
Lawyers from Portland, Oregon
Living people
Democratic Party members of the Oregon House of Representatives
Women state legislators in Oregon
People from Washington County, Oregon
University of Oregon alumni
Willamette University College of Law alumni
Year of birth missing (living people)